The Toronto Film Critics Association Award for Best Actress is one of the annual awards given by the Toronto Film Critics Association.

Winners

1990s

2000s

2010s

2020s

Notes

References

External links
Toronto Film Critics Association - Past Award Winners

Film awards for lead actress